Russell Library may refer to:

 Richard B. Russell Library for Political Research and Studies, on the campus of the University of Georgia in Athens
 Russell Library (Middletown, Connecticut), a Gothic Revival building near the Church of the Holy Trinity and Rectory
 Russell Library (St. Patrick's College), Maynooth, Ireland